Enric Morera i Català (Oliva, Valencia, 3 April 1964) is a Spanish politician who is the leader of the Valencian Nationalist Bloc and the Compromís coalition.

Morera was a Member of the European Parliament in 2004, as part of The Greens–European Free Alliance group, and since 2007 has been a member of the Valencian Parliament.

After 2015 Valencian parliamentary election, he was elected President of the Corts Valencianes, the Valencian Parliament, as a result of a pact formed by Compromís and the Socialist Party of the Valencian Country.

References

External links

 Personal Website
 Morera at Corts Valencianes website
 Bloc Nacionalista Valencià's Website
 Coalició Compromís' Website

1964 births
Living people
Presidents of the Corts Valencianes
MEPs for Spain 1999–2004
The Greens–European Free Alliance MEPs
Valencian Nationalist Bloc politicians
People from Safor
People from Valencia
Members of the 7th Corts Valencianes
Members of the 8th Corts Valencianes
Members of the 9th Corts Valencianes
Members of the 10th Corts Valencianes